Neely Tucker (born November 26, 1963, in Lexington, Mississippi) is a journalist and writer. He is the author of Love in the Driest Season, an autobiographical story that touches on his journey from his education at a whites-only school in Mississippi, to his marriage to a Jamaican, to his adoption of a Zimbabwean child. A former journalist at The Washington Post, he previously worked as a foreign correspondent in Zimbabwe, where he and his wife Vita lived, eventually adopting a child. He is currently a writer-editor in the Office of Communications at the Library of Congress.

Personal
Tucker was raised in Mississippi by his parents Elizabeth and Duane Tucker. He has a brother named Duane Jr. He lives near Washington DC. His favorite teams are Mississippi State and the New Orleans Saints.

Education
Tucker attended Starkville Academy, a segregation academy. He started first grade at SA on the day it opened and graduated in 1982, playing football, writing for the school's newspaper, and earning the title Mister Starkville Academy. After graduating high school, he went on to attend Mississippi State University but later obtained his degree from the University of Mississippi where he was selected as the most outstanding journalism student at graduation in 1986. In 2018 he returned to Starkville Academy and delivered a speech on racism, in which he drew an analogy between white students such as himself and monsters, and compared the Mississippi of the mid twentieth-century with the apartheid rule in South Africa.

Career
Throughout Tucker's career, he has reported from more than 50 countries around the world. While attending the University of Mississippi, he worked for the Oxford Eagle in Mississippi. Upon graduating, he went on to work for Florida Today, Gannett's national wire service, and the Miami Herald. He then served as a foreign correspondent at the Detroit Free Press. Tucker was nominated for the Pulitzer Prize in 2011 for "Life After Death," a story about his wife's seven-year odyssey to help convict her daughter's killer. In 2019 Tucker became a writer-editor at the Library of Congress.

Books
Love in the Driest Season
Murder DC
Only the Hunted Run
The Ways of the Dead

References

External links

1963 births
Living people
American male journalists
20th-century American memoirists
20th-century American journalists
People from Lexington, Mississippi